Fortunato Castillo (born 16 March 1939) is a Bolivian footballer. He played in six matches for the Bolivia national football team in 1963. He was also part of Bolivia's squad that won the 1963 South American Championship.

References

External links
 

1939 births
Living people
Bolivian footballers
Bolivia international footballers
Place of birth missing (living people)
Association football midfielders
Chaco Petrolero players
Club Bolívar players